Brezje is a small settlement in the City Municipality of Novo Mesto in southeastern Slovenia. It lies in the hills to the south of the main road between Novo Mesto and Šentjernej. The entire municipality is part of the traditional region of Lower Carniola and is now included in the Southeast Slovenia Statistical Region.

Name
Brezje was attested in written sources as Pirkch in 1436. The name of the settlement is shared with several other places in Slovenia and is derived from the Slovene common noun brezje 'birch grove', referring to the local vegetation.

References

External links
Brezje on Geopedia

Populated places in the City Municipality of Novo Mesto